Raphael David Maklouf  (born 10 December 1937) is a British sculptor, best known for designing an effigy of Queen Elizabeth II used on the coins of many Commonwealth nations.

Maklouf was born in Jerusalem, to a Jewish family; his father was Samuel Maklouf (1911–1990, born in Safed, then in Palestine); his mother was Leonie Maklouf (born in Saarbrücken, Germany, 1915).

The family emigrated to the United Kingdom after the Second World War. Raphael Maklouf attended the Camberwell School of Art until 1958, afterwards becoming an academic lecturer for ten years. He was made an Associate of the Royal Society of British Sculptors in 1979.

Two of his designs were selected for British coinage on 8 August 1984, one for general circulation and another for commemorative issues. They were used on the coins of several countries from 1985 to 1997. His initials, RDM, are engraved at the base of the Queen's neck. He is additionally known for his sculptural design representing the fifteen Stations of the Cross in Brentwood Cathedral. He is associated with Tower Mint Ltd, which privately produces medals, coins for collectors, and similar items.

References

External links
Tower Mint website

1937 births
British people of Palestinian-Jewish descent
Living people
Jews in Mandatory Palestine
People from Jerusalem
Alumni of Camberwell College of Arts
Mandatory Palestine emigrants to the United Kingdom
20th-century British sculptors
British male sculptors
Coin designers
20th-century British male artists